Victor I. Hoagland Sr. (May 4, 1936 – January 12, 2002), known professionally as Hoagy Lands, was an American soul singer.

Biography
Lands was born in New Brunswick, New Jersey, United States, to an Afro-Cuban father and an African American mother of American Indian descent, Lands formed a group at Roosevelt Junior High School in Elizabeth, New Jersey that was called TNB (The New Brunswick) Dynaflows.

His recording career spanned from the late 1950s on into the mid-1970s, recording a few duets with Lily Field. He made appearances in England shortly before his death in 2002, in Orange, New Jersey, following heart surgery.

His grandson is recording artist Jaheim.

Discography
Ivory (unknown number) – Oo-Be-Do / You're Only Young Once – 1959
Judi 054 – (I'm Gonna) Cry Some Tears / Lighted Windows – 1961
ABC-Paramount 10171 – (I'm Gonna) Cry Some Tears / Lighted Windows – 1961
MGM K-13041 – My Tears Are Dry / It's Gonna Be Morning – 1961
MGM K-13062 – Goodnight Irene / It Ain't Easy As That – 1961 
ABC-Paramount 10392 – Tender Years / I'm Yours – 1963
Atlantic 2217 – Baby Come On Home / Baby Let Me Hold Your Hand (Backing vocals by Cissy Houston, Dee Dee Warwick and Judy Clay – Eric Gale on guitar) – 1964 
Laurie 3349 – Theme From The Other Side / Friends And Lovers Don't Go Together – 1966
Laurie 3361 – Theme From The Other Side / September – 1967 
Laurie 3372 – Yesterday / Forever in My Heart- 1967 
Laurie 3381 – The Next in Line / Please Don't Talk About Me When I'm Gone (Backing vocals by The Chiffons) – 1967 
Laurie 3463 – Two Years and a Thousand Tears (Since I Left Augusta) / White Gardenia – 1968

With Lily Fields
 Stardust 028 – I'm Yours / The Tender Years – 1963
 Spectrum 116 – Beautiful Music / Crying Candle – 1969
Spectrum 118 – Sweet Soul (Brother) / A Boy in a Man's World – 1970
Spectrum 122 – Do You Know What Life Is All About / Why Didn't You Let Me Know – 1972 
Spectrum 129 – Reminisce / Why Didn't You Let Me Know – 1972 
Spectrum 130 – A Man Ain't No Stronger Than His Heart / Do It Twice – 1972
Paramount 0232 – Mary Ann / Pledging My Love – 1973
Spectrum 140 – The Bell Ringer / (Instrumental) – 1976

In popular culture
Lands' recording of Lighted Windows was played over the end titles of Season 4, Episode 8 of Orange Is the New Black in June 2016.

References

1936 births
2002 deaths
Musicians from New Brunswick, New Jersey
American soul singers
American people of Cuban descent
American people who self-identify as being of Native American descent
20th-century African-American male singers